The 1867 Manuherikia by-election was a by-election held on 29 November 1864 in the  electorate during the 4th New Zealand Parliament.

The by-election was caused by the resignation of the incumbent MP William Baldwin on 15 February 1867.

The by-election was contested by David Mervyn and John Jack. When Jack won the "show of hands" at the nomination meeting, the by-election was demanded and won by Mervyn.

Results

References

Manuherikia 1867
1867 elections in New Zealand
Politics of Otago
April 1867 events